Miss Sint Maarten  (St. Maarten) is a national beauty pageant that selects queen from Sint Maarten representative to Miss Universe pageant between 1976 and 1982. This pageant is incorporated to Miss St. Martin who selects the winner to Miss France since 2012.

History
The official winner of Miss St. Maarten (Dutch) is expected to go to Miss Caribbean Queen. Between 1976 and 1982 the winners went to Miss Universe and between 1998 and 2001 the constituent country of Sint Maarten sent delegates to Miss World. In 2015 Minister of Tourism, Economic Affairs, Transport & Telecommunications Hon. Claret Connor, is one of the proud sponsors of Miss Sint Maarten 2015/2016.

Miss Sint Maarten 2014
Soniya Bag Assumed as Miss Sint Maarten 2014; in 2014 the national pageant was organised in St. Maarten for the first time

Sint Maarten participation in Miss World 2021
On December 15, the government of Sint Maarten officially denounced the participation of Lara Mateo at Miss World 2021. The current franchise holder of the Miss and Mr World license for Sint Maarten did not select Lara Mateo for her participation; they are currently under investigation by the government.

Prime Minister Silveria Jacobs said the government discovered that Lara Mateo was registered by Guadeloupe's franchise holder to represent Sint Maarten. Sint Maarten government issued an official letter stating that they did not endorse Lara Mateo to Miss World Limited. She added that Collectivité de Saint-Martin, neither their Tourism Department nor the Culture Department, did not know or acknowledge the candidate and reassured that their winners would solely compete at Miss France.

Titleholders

Sint Maarten at International pageants

Miss Universe Sint Maarten

Miss World Sint Maarten

References

Recurring events established in 1976